Sreela Majumdar (also credited as Srila Mazumdar) is an actress in the Bengali language film industry of India. She has done voice dubbing for Aishwarya Rai in the film Chokher Bali (2003).

Early life
She was born to Ramchandra Majumdar and Nani Majumdar. She earned her bachelor's degree from the Bangabasi College, an affiliated college of the University of Calcutta. In 1980, she debuted in the film Parasuram directed by Mrinal Sen.

Filmography
 Parasuram as Alhadi
 Ek Din Pratidin as Minu
 Akaler Sandhane a.k.a. In Search Of Famine (1980)
 Kharij as Sreeja
 Chokh as Jadunath's Widow
 Arohan as Panchi
 Mandi as Phoolmani
 Nagmoti (1983)
 Khandhar as Gauri
 Damul a.k.a. Bonded Until Death (1985)
 Chopper (1986)
 Ek Pal a.k.a. A Moment (1986)
 Etwa (1988)
 Aakrant (1988)
 Chandaneer (1989)
 Mon Mayuree (1990)
 Neelimay Neel (1991)
 Ek Pashia Brishti (1991)
 Prasab (1994)
 Phiriye Dao (1994)
 Puja (1996)
 Asol Nakol (1998)
 Pratibad (2001) as Meenu, Rana's elder sister
 Rangamati (2008)
 Abhisandhi (2011)
 Amar Prithibi (2015)
 Bhalobasar Bari (2018)
 Shankar Mudi (2019) as Wife of Shankar Mudi
 The Parcel (2020)
 Sleelatahanir Pore (2021) as Mandira
 Palan (2023)

References

External links
 

Actresses from Kolkata
Bangabasi College alumni
University of Calcutta alumni
Living people
Actresses in Bengali cinema
Indian film actresses
Year of birth missing (living people)
20th-century Indian actresses